Callimedusa atelopoides is a species of frog in the subfamily Phyllomedusinae. It is known from Amazonian Bolivia, Brazil, and Peru, and is likely to be found in adjacent Colombia and Ecuador. Common name toady leaf frog has been proposed for it.

Description
Adult males measure  and adult females  in snout–vent length. The snout is bluntly rounded in dorsal view and truncate in profile. The parotoid gland is diffuse. The fingers and toes bear small discs. The limbs are relatively short. Skin is smooth dorsally. The dorsum is purplish brown and has scattered metallic green flecks. The flanks and ventral surfaces are bluish white with dark purple between the granules. The iris is silvery gray and has black flecks.

The male advertisement call is a single "wort".

Habitat and conservation
It is a terrestrial frog that is active on the ground or low vegetation at night. The eggs are deposited on leaves and the tadpoles develop in temporary bodies of water. It is not present in modified habitats. It is a widespread but uncommon species that can locally suffer from habitat loss caused by, e.g., logging and agriculture. It is present in a number of protected areas.

References

atelopoides
Amphibians of Bolivia
Amphibians of Brazil
Amphibians of Peru
Taxa named by David C. Cannatella
Taxa named by William Edward Duellman
Amphibians described in 1988
Taxonomy articles created by Polbot